Cleburne High School is a public high school located in the city of Cleburne, Texas. The school is in the Cleburne Independent School District.

History 
A high school was occupied in Cleburne in the 1910s, replacing an older schoolhouse.

The school was completely renovated in 2020.

2017 riots

On March 22, 2017, following a series of controversial decisions by the school district, beginning with the school board not allowing a former coach attend his son's college signing, a large portion of the student body protested in both the bottom and upper floor of the high school. The plan for the protest started spreading that morning on social media, calling for students to meet at "Mrs. Sisco's classroom" to protest the school boards refusal to renew the teachers contract. At around 11:30 it was then discovered that the Drama teachers contract was also not renewed. At 1 o'clock during a passing period, students chanted "protest, protest" and "down with Downs" (a reference the schools principal). Students also proceeded to throw things at the principal from the second floor. 3 minutes later at 1:03 PM, a student pulled the fire alarm, causing the evacuation of the building. At 1:17 students were allowed back into the building and a student was arrested for pulling the alarm. By the end of the day, over 200 students signed a petition calling for the firing of the school principal, and over 600 people signed a petition advocating for the renewal of Mrs. Sisco's contract. The next day at 2:40 PM a smaller protest began and ended after facility told students to leave the building if they wanted to take part in the protest.

Sports 
The Cleburne Yellow Jackets play football games at the Yellow Jacket Stadium. The stadium was built in time for the 1941 football season, on a plot of land that was in possession of the then-Superintendent Emmett Brown. At this point, the  team were coached by Ernest Guinn, future principal and later superintendent.

Cleburne has won three state championships. The most recent was in 1995 in 4A girls basketball, and twice before in football, both times being recognized as co-champions when the championship game ended in a tie. The first title was in 1920 (with Houston Heights High School), which was also the first championship recognized by Dave Campbell's Texas Football. The second was in 1959 at Class AAA, a co-championship with Breckenridge.

References 

Buildings and structures in Cleburne, Texas
Public high schools in Texas
Schools in Johnson County, Texas